Karoline Käfer (31 October 1954 – 11 March 2023) was an Austrian sprinter. She won three medals at the European Indoor Championships.

With 23.09 seconds over 200 metres and 50.62 seconds over 400 metres Käfer holds two Austrian records.

Käfer died on 11 March 2023, at the age of 68.

Achievements

References

 Sports Reference

1954 births
2023 deaths
Austrian female sprinters
Athletes (track and field) at the 1972 Summer Olympics
Athletes (track and field) at the 1980 Summer Olympics
Olympic athletes of Austria
Olympic female sprinters